Hopen is a former municipality in Møre og Romsdal county, Norway.  The  municipality existed from 1915 until its dissolution in 1960.  It covered the northeastern part of the island of Smøla, plus the small islands to the north such as Veiholmen, Hammarøya, and Haugøya. The administrative centre of the municipality was the village of Hopen where the Hopen Church is located.

History
The municipality of Hopen was established on 1 January 1915 when the large municipality of Edøy was split into three to form the new municipalities of Edøy (population: 973), Hopen (population: 1,050), and Brattvær (population: 1,452). During the 1960s, there were many municipal mergers across Norway due to the work of the Schei Committee. On 1 January 1960, the 1915 partition was reversed, reuniting the municipalities of Brattvær, Edøy, and Hopen as the new municipality of Smøla. Before the merger, Hopen had a population of 1,550.

Name
The municipality was named after the village of Hopen which was the location of the local church.  The name comes from the Old Norse word  which means "bay".

Government
The municipal council  of Hopen was made up of 17 representatives that were elected to four year terms.  The party breakdown of the final municipal council was as follows:

See also
List of former municipalities of Norway

References

Smøla
Former municipalities of Norway
1915 establishments in Norway
1960 disestablishments in Norway